Juan Quero Barraso (born 17 October 1984) is a Spanish footballer who plays as an attacking midfielder for Real Aranjuez.

Club career
Born in Vallecas, Madrid, Quero began playing football for Real Madrid, joining lowly DAV Santa Ana (fourth division) after his unsuccessful youth spell. In the summer of 2005 he signed for another team from Madrid, AD Alcorcón, moving up to the third level.

Quero signed with division two side Polideportivo Ejido for the 2006–07 season. However, a few months later, the Royal Spanish Football Federation deemed the deal illegal, and the player returned to his previous club without any official appearances for the Andalusians.

In 2007–08, Quero finally played in the second tier, being an important attacking weapon as CD Numancia returned to La Liga after a three-year absence. He produced roughly the same numbers in the following campaign, but did not find the net and the Sorians were relegated; his debut in the Spanish top flight came on 14 September 2008, in a 3–4 loss away loss against Real Madrid.

Quero competed in the second division in the following years, representing Rayo Vallecano, Elche CF, UD Las Palmas and Córdoba CF. In 2013 he moved abroad, starting with Dubai CSC then switching to the Thai League 1.

During season 2020-21, Quero retired from football after had been diagnostic with a heart arrhythmia.

Club statistics

Honours
Numancia
Segunda División: 2007–08

References

External links

1984 births
Living people
Footballers from Madrid
Spanish footballers
Association football midfielders
AD Alcorcón footballers
Polideportivo Ejido footballers
CD Numancia players
Rayo Vallecano players
Elche CF players
UD Las Palmas players
Córdoba CF players
Hércules CF players
CF Fuenlabrada footballers
Dubai CSC players
Juan Quero
Juan Quero
Oriente Petrolero players
Birkirkara F.C. players
DSK Shivajians FC players
RoundGlass Punjab FC players
CD Paracuellos Antamira players
I-League players
La Liga players
Segunda División players
Segunda División B players
Tercera División players
UAE Pro League players
Juan Quero
Maltese Premier League players
Bolivian Primera División players
Spanish expatriate footballers
Expatriate footballers in the United Arab Emirates
Expatriate footballers in Thailand
Expatriate footballers in Bolivia
Expatriate footballers in Malta
Expatriate footballers in India
Spanish expatriate sportspeople in the United Arab Emirates
Spanish expatriate sportspeople in Thailand
Spanish expatriate sportspeople in Bolivia
Spanish expatriate sportspeople in Malta
Spanish expatriate sportspeople in India